Pyay Mintha Monastery is a historic royal Buddhist monastery in Mandalay, Burma. The wooden monastery dates to 1839, and was donated by the Prince of Pyay, the son of King Tharrawaddy Min. Parts of the monastery were restored in 2017.

See also
Kyaung

References

Monasteries in Myanmar
Buddhist temples in Mandalay
19th-century Buddhist temples
Religious buildings and structures completed in 1839